The Aguja Formation is a geological formation in North America, exposed in Texas, United States and Chihuahua and Coahuila in Mexico, whose strata date back to the Late Cretaceous. Dinosaur remains are among the fossils that have been recovered from the formation. Fossil palms have also been unearthed here.

Age 
The ages of the Aguja Formation and its primary fossil-bearing unit, the Upper Shale, are not well understood. Due to the presence of the ammonite Baculites mclearni, which only occurs from 80.67 - 80.21 Ma, in the underlying Rattlesnake Mountain Sandstone and the Terlingua Creek Sandstone, it is likely that the Upper Shale was younger than 80.2 Ma. A radiometric date of 76.9 Ma was recovered in the Upper Shale, making it likely the formation wasn't younger than 76.9 Ma. The contact with the overlying Javelina Formation has been estimated at about 70 Ma ago but also as recently as 68.5 million years ago. This is unlikely, however, due to the presence of Bravoceratops, more primitive than an unnamed chasmosaurine from the De-na-zin Member of the Kirtland Formation, in the lowermost section of the formation. The age of the Basal Sandstone is constrained by the presence of Scaphites hippocrepis III in the overlying Pen Formation which has been dated as old as 81.53 Ma.

Vertebrate paleofauna

Reptiles
2 fragmentary caudal vertebrae of indeterminate reptiles are known from the Rattlesnake Mountain sandstone member.

Pseudosuchians

Ornithischians

Theropods 
Indeterminate ornithomimid remains are known from the Upper Aguja Formation. Indeterminate tyrannosaurid fossils are known from the Upper Aguja Formation of Texas and Mexico.

Lepidosaurs

Turtles

Bony Fish
Approximately 75 whole and broken fragments of coprolites are known from the Rattlesnake Mountain sandstone member, presumably from bony fish.

Cartilaginous fish

Invertebrates

Ammonites

See also 
 List of dinosaur-bearing rock formations

References

Bibliography 
 
 Longrich, N.R., Sankey, J., and Tanke, D. (2010) Texacephale langstoni, a new genus of pachycephalosaurid (Dinosauria: Ornithischia) from the upper  Campanian Aguja Formation, southern Texas, USA. Cretaceous Research. .
 Sullivan, R.M., and Lucas, S.G. 2006. "The Kirtlandian land-vertebrate "age" – faunal composition, temporal position and biostratigraphic correlation in the nonmarine Upper Cretaceous of western North America." New Mexico Museum of Natural History and Science, Bulletin 35:7-29.
 Spencer G. Lucas, Robert M. Sullivan and Adrian P. Hunt: Re-evaluation of Pentaceratops and Chasmosaurus (Ornithischia: Ceratopsidae) in the Upper Cretaceous of the Western Interior. In: New Mexico Museum of Natural History and Science Bulletin 35 (2006), S. 367-370.PDF
 
  

Geologic formations of Texas
Cretaceous geology of Texas
Geologic formations of Mexico
Cretaceous Mexico
Campanian Stage
Sandstone formations
Conglomerate formations
Shale formations
Deltaic deposits
Lacustrine deposits
Tidal deposits
Paleontology in Mexico
Paleontology in Texas
Formations
Formations